Weekends with Maury and Connie is an MSNBC television news series featuring light-hearted take on news of the week.

It was hosted by talk show host Maury Povich and his wife, television news anchor Connie Chung. Beginning in early 2006, it appeared every weekend morning on MSNBC until Dan Abrams was appointed the new General Manager of MSNBC. Due to the show's low ratings, near the bottom of the charts, Abrams canceled the show. The last broadcast aired June 17, 2006.

On the final episode, Chung, dressed in a white evening gown and writhing atop a black piano, sang a parody to the tune of "Thanks for the Memory". Video clips of the bizarre, off-key farewell performance circulated on internet video sites like YouTube, and have been seen by more people that viewed Weekends with Maury and Connie during its run.

References

MSNBC original programming
2000s American television news shows
2006 American television series debuts
2006 American television series endings
English-language television shows